Kirill Zinovyev (born February 22, 1979) is a Kazakhstani goaltender who was the third string goalie for the Kazakhstan men's national ice hockey team in the 2006 Winter Olympics.

References

Living people
1979 births
Sportspeople from Oskemen
Barys Nur-Sultan players
Kazakhstani ice hockey goaltenders
Ice hockey players at the 2006 Winter Olympics
Olympic ice hockey players of Kazakhstan
Asian Games gold medalists for Kazakhstan
Asian Games silver medalists for Kazakhstan
Medalists at the 1999 Asian Winter Games
Medalists at the 2003 Asian Winter Games
Asian Games medalists in ice hockey
Ice hockey players at the 1999 Asian Winter Games
Ice hockey players at the 2003 Asian Winter Games